Wobbenbüll (North Frisian: Wååbel) is a municipality in the district of Nordfriesland, in Schleswig-Holstein, Germany.

Sons and daughters of the community 
 Harro Harring (1798-1870), revolutionary, poet and painter

References

Nordfriesland